Events from the year 1796 in the United States.

Incumbents

Federal Government 
 President: George Washington (no political party-Virginia)
 Vice President: John Adams (F-Massachusetts)
 Chief Justice: Oliver Ellsworth (Connecticut)
 Speaker of the House of Representatives: Jonathan Dayton (F-New Jersey)
 Congress: 4th

Events
 February 29 – Ratifications of the Jay Treaty between the United States and Great Britain are officially exchanged, bringing it into effect. Britain vacates the forts it has been retaining in the Great Lakes region.
 March 30 – John Sevier is inaugurated as first governor of Tennessee.
 June 1 – Tennessee is admitted as the 16th U.S. state (see History of Tennessee).
 July 11 – The United States takes possession of Detroit from Great Britain under the terms of the Jay Treaty.
 July 14 – The de Portolá Expedition sets out from San Diego (modern-day San Diego, California) to find the Port of Monterey (modern Monterey, California).
 July 22 – Surveyors of the Connecticut Land Company name an area in Ohio "Cleveland" after Gen. Moses Cleaveland, the superintendent of the surveying party.
 August 2 – Marc Isambard Brunel is granted citizenship of the United States; in the autumn he is appointed chief engineer of New York City.
 August 31 – John McKinly, the first President of Delaware, dies in Wilmington, Delaware.
 September 17 – U.S. President George Washington issues his Farewell Address, which warns against partisan politics and foreign entanglements.
 November 2 – John Adams defeats Thomas Jefferson in the U.S. presidential election.
 November 4 – The Treaty of Tripoli (between the United States and Tripoli) is signed at Tripoli (see also 1797).
 November 10 – The de Portolá Expedition returns from its terminus point (modern-day Menlo Park, California) to San Diego after failing to find Vizcaíno's Port of Monterey (modern Monterey, California).
 December 7 – The U.S. Electoral College meets to elect John Adams president.

Ongoing
 Panic of 1796–1797 (1796–1797)

Births
 February 18 – John Bell, United States Senator from Tennessee from 1847 till 1859. (died 1869)
 April 10 – Thomas Fitzgerald, United States Senator from Michigan from 1848 till 1849. (died 1855)
 July 24 – John M. Clayton, United States Senator from Delaware from 1829 till 1836, from 1845 till 1849 and from 1853 till 1856. (died 1856)
 September 26 – Richard H. Bayard, United States Senator from Delaware from 1841 till 1845. (died 1868)

Deaths
 January 5 – Samuel Huntington, 7th President of the Continental Congress, signatory of the Declaration of Independence and Articles of Confederation (born 1731)
 June 11 – Nathaniel Gorham, President of the Continental Congress, signatory of the United States Constitution (born 1738)
 June 21 – Richard Gridley, Revolutionary soldier (born 1710)
 June 26 – David Rittenhouse, astronomer, inventor, mathematician, surveyor, scientific instrument craftsman and public official (born 1732)
 June 30 – Abraham Yates, Continental Congressman (born 1724)
 August 31 – John McKinly, physician and 1st president of Delaware (born 1721)

See also
Timeline of United States history (1790–1819)

Further reading
 Dr. Belknap's Tour to Oneida, 1796. Proceedings of the Massachusetts Historical Society, Vol. 19 (1881–1882)
 Henry S. Parsons. William and Mary College in 1796. The William and Mary Quarterly, Second Series, Vol. 15, No. 2 (April, 1935), pp. 199–200.
 Bernard Fa. Early Party Machinery in the United States: Pennsylvania in the Election of 1796. The Pennsylvania Magazine of History and Biography, Vol. 60, No. 4 (October, 1936), pp. 375–390.
 Bayrd Still. The Westward Migration of a Planter Pioneer in 1796. The William and Mary Quarterly, Second Series, Vol. 21, No. 4 (October, 1941), pp. 318–343.
 John D. Barnhart. The Tennessee Constitution of 1796: A Product of the Old West. The Journal of Southern History, Vol. 9, No. 4 (November, 1943), pp. 532–548.
 Marion Tinling. Cawsons, Virginia, in 1795-1796. The William and Mary Quarterly, Third Series, Vol. 3, No. 2 (April, 1946), pp. 281–291.
 Mary Tolford Wilson. Amelia Simmons Fills a Need: American Cookery, 1796. The William and Mary Quarterly, Third Series, Vol. 14, No. 1 (January, 1957), pp. 16–30.
 Alexander DeConde. Washington's Farewell, the French Alliance, and the Election of 1796. The Mississippi Valley Historical Review, Vol. 43, No. 4 (March, 1957), pp. 641–658.
 John L. Earl III. Talleyrand in Philadelphia, 1794-1796. The Pennsylvania Magazine of History and Biography, Vol. 91, No. 3 (July, 1967), pp. 282–298.
 Edwin R. Baldridge Jr. Talleyrand's visit to Pennsylvania, 1794-1796. Pennsylvania History, Vol. 36, No. 2 (1969), pp. 145–160.
 Arthur Scherr. The Significance of Thomas Pinckney's Candidacy in the Election of 1796. The South Carolina Historical Magazine, Vol. 76, No. 2 (April, 1975), pp. 51–59.
 Lee W. Formwalt. An English Immigrant Views American Society: Benjamin Henry Latrobe's Virginia Years, 1796-1798. The Virginia Magazine of History and Biography, Vol. 85, No. 4 (October, 1977), pp. 387–410.
 Richard Wojtowicz, Billy G. Smith. Advertisements For Runaway Slaves, Indentured Servants, and Apprentices in the Pennsylvania Gazette, 1795–1796. Pennsylvania History, Vol. 54, No. 1 (January 1987), pp. 34–71.
 Glynn R. deV. Barratt. A Russian View of Philadelphia, 1795-96: From the Journal of Lieutenant Iurii Lisianskii. Pennsylvania History, Vol. 65, No. 1, Benjamin Franklin and His Enemies (Winter 1998), pp. 62–86.

References

External links
 

 
1790s in the United States
United States
United States
Years of the 18th century in the United States